The Serbian Women's Cup (Serbian: Kupa Srbija za zene) is the national women's football cup competition in Serbia and was first held in 2007.

List of finals
The predecessor of the cup was the Cup of Yugoslavia, held from 1975 to 1991, after that the Cup of FR Yugoslavia until 2002 and the Cup of Serbia and Montenegro until 2006. Those cup winners are listed. After that, the list of finals:

Yugoslavia Cup winners
1975 ŽNK Zagreb
1977 ŽNK Loto Zagreb
1978 ŽNK Loto Zagreb
1979 ŽFK Sloga Zemun
1980 ŽNK Sloboda '78 Zagreb
1981 ŽFK Sloga Zemun
1982 ŽNK Sloboda '78 Zagreb
1983 ŽFK Mašinac Niš
1984 ŽFK Mašinac Niš
1985 ŽFK Sloga Zemun
1986 ŽFK Željezničar Sarajevo
1987 ŽNK Maksimir Zagreb
1988 ŽFK Mašinac Niš
1989 ŽFK Mašinac Niš
1990 ŽNK Maksimir Zagreb
1991 ŽFK Classic Mašinac Niš
FR Yugoslavia Cup winners
1992 Mašinac Niš
1993 Sloga Zemun
1994 Sloga Zemun
1995 Mašinac Niš
1996 Mašinac Niš
1997 Mašinac Niš
1998 Yumco Vranje
1999 Mašinac Niš
2000 Yumco Vranje
2001 Yumco Vranje
2002 Yumco Vranje
Serbia and Montenegro Cup winners
2003 Mašinac Niš
2004 Napredak Kruševac
2005 Napredak Kruševac
2006 Napredak Kruševac

See also
Serbian Cup, men's edition

References

External links
Cup at Serbia Football Federation

Ser
Women's football competitions in Serbia
Recurring sporting events established in 2007
2007 establishments in Serbia
Women